Secretary of Foreign Affairs heads the department of foreign affairs of the Federated States of Micronesia in the government. 

A list of officeholders follows.

1979–1990: Andon Amaraich
1990–1991: Asterio R. Takesy 
1991–1992: Epel K. Ilon 
1992–1996: Resio S. Moses
1996–1997: Asterio R. Takesy
1997–2000: Epel K. Ilon
2000–2003: Ieske K. Iehsi 
2003............ David Panuelo 
2003–2007: Sebastian Anefal
2007–2019: Lorin S. Robert
2019–present: Kandhi A. Elieisar

References

Foreign
Foreign Ministers
 
1979 establishments in the Federated States of Micronesia